New Petersburg is an unincorporated community in Highland County, in the U.S. state of Ohio.

History
New Petersburg was laid out in 1817. A post office called New Petersburgh was established in 1829, the name was changed to New Petersburg in 1893, and the post office closed in 1932.

References

Unincorporated communities in Highland County, Ohio
Unincorporated communities in Ohio